In set theory, a discipline within mathematics, an admissible set is a transitive set  such that  is a model of Kripke–Platek set theory (Barwise 1975).

The smallest example of an admissible set is the set of hereditarily finite sets. Another example is the set of hereditarily countable sets.

See also
 Admissible ordinal

References 

 Barwise, Jon (1975). Admissible Sets and Structures: An Approach to Definability Theory, Perspectives in Mathematical Logic, Volume 7, Springer-Verlag. Electronic version on Project Euclid.

Set theory